The Fourth Asian Beach Games were held in Phuket Island, Phuket Province, Thailand. The games were originally scheduled for Boracay Island, Aklan, Philippines, but was affected by the OCA's hosting changes.

The games were held on the same year of the 17th Asian Games. It was the seventh time for Thailand to host an Asia level multi-sports event, after Bangkok held four Asian Games (1966, 1970, 1978 and 1998), one Asian Indoor Games (2005) and one Asian Martial Arts Games (2009). However, it was the first time that the event would not be held in Bangkok.

Emblem
The emblem of the 4th Asian Beach Games was driven by Phuket's very own beauty and by one of Phuket's most mesmerizing sceneries of Laem Promthep with such beauty that Phuket possesses, Phuket is also widely recognized as the Pearl of the Andaman Sea and the Southern of Thailand Paradise" where athletes, spectators and tourists could enjoy watching the ongoing game while at the same time allowing themselves to serenely sink into the spell-binding beauty of Phuket beaches and sceneries.

The two palm trees standing side by side represents the coming together of athletes and of all participants from different nations and races, to unite and to participate together in the 4th Asian Beach Games.

As for the middle, the Asian Beach Games is the center of this beautiful bonding between the races in which the athletes represents. The ocean waves tinted in the color of the Thai flag symbolizes the qualities in which Thailand possesses; the Thai flag swirling could be understood as a representation of the determination of the athletes in participating in the competition.

Mascot

“Sea turtle” is a symbol of endurance fertility, sustainability and growth. As Phuket is a home to many rare species of sea turtle, it is a chance to announce to the participants of the 4th Asian Beach Games and also to the public that Thailand pays great attention and an important role to the conservation of sea turtle.

As sea turtle are amphibious creatures, living both on land and in the sea, the 4th Asian Beach Games will have both beach sports and water sports which at the same time is an excellent symbol of the relationships of the different countries in Asia.

The name Sintu, Sakorn, Samut shares the same meaning of water.

Could be metaphorically be compared to the qualities of athletes which includes the qualities such as tolerance, tranquility, unity, acceptance, sportsmanship and friendship.

Venues

The 4th Asian Beach Games have 6 venues for this games.

Torch relay 
H.M. King Bhumibol Adulyadej has graciously designated H.R.H. Crown Prince Maha Vajiralongkorn on October 23 at Amphorn Sathan Residential Hall, Dusit Palace as the Royal Representative to deliver the Royal Flame to the organizing committee for use in the 4th Asian Beach Games.

Those who have granted an audience to receive the Royal Flame from H.R.H. Crown Prince Maha Vajiralongkorn were the organising committee members led by Tourism and Sports Minister Kobkarn Wattanavrangkul as the chairwoman of the organizing committee, Yuthasak Sasiprapha, president of the Olympic Committee of Thailand, Montri Chaipun, deputy governor of the Sports Authority of Thailand who also served as the SAT’s caretaker governor, and Phuket Governor Nisit Chamsomwong.

Dr.Jaturaporn Na Nakhon, chairman of the Royal Flame Committee, revealed that after this the installment of the Royal Flame will be temporarily made at the SAT Office in Hua Mark. The Flame will next be transferred to Phuket on November 10. To celebrate the Games Flame, Thai people from all walks of life can join the Flame run in three different districts which comprise Kathu District on November 11, Mueang Phuket District the following day and Thalang District on November 13.

Sports
The 4th Asian Beach Games have 26 sports were contested in this edition of Asian Beach Games.

 
 
  Paragliding (4)
  Paramotoring (4)
 Aquatics

Calendar

Participating nations
42 out of the 45 Asian countries took part. North Korea, Saudi Arabia and Palestine did not compete. Below is a list of all the participating NOCs; the number of competitors per delegation is indicated in brackets.

Medal table

References

External links
Official website
Phuket Scene - Asian Beach Games

 
Asian Games, Beach
Asian Games, Beach
Asian Games, Beach
Asian Games, Beach
Asian Beach Games
Asian Games, Beach